Typha subulata is a plant species native to Argentina and Uruguay. The species grows in freshwater marshes. Type collection was made in 1966 in the Río Negro Province, Departamento de General Roca.

References

subulata
Freshwater plants
Flora of Uruguay
Flora of Argentina
Plants described in 1967